First National Bank Omaha is a bank headquartered in Omaha, Nebraska. The namesake and leading subsidiary of First National of Nebraska, it is the third largest privately held bank subsidiary in the United States with $17 billion in assets and 4320 employees.

Chartered and headquartered in Omaha, Nebraska, United States, First National provides corporate banking, investment banking, retail banking, wealth management and consumer lending services at locations in Nebraska, Iowa, Colorado, Texas, Kansas, South Dakota and Illinois. The bank operates a total of 109 branches throughout the Midwest.

History
In 1856, a group of settlers from Kanesville, Iowa crossed the Missouri River to picnic in the newly named Nebraska Territory. One of the visitors, Thomas Davis, helped found Omaha when he donated $600 in gold dust for an official charter. He eventually served on First National Bank's board of directors. Two immigrant brothers from Ohio, Herman and Augustus Kountze, opened Kountze Brothers Bank in 1857. Omaha's first bank opened its doors and started trading primarily in gold dust and buffalo hides. Kountze Brothers Bank received national charter #209 in 1863. Today, theirs is the oldest national bank west of the Missouri River. In 1863, they also began doing business as First National Bank of Omaha and brought in additional investors, including Edward Creighton, who served as president.

In 1883, Herman Kountze speculated on land in North Omaha, eventually developing an affluent Omaha suburb called Kountze Place in the former town of Saratoga. The panic of 1893 sparked the worst depression of the 19th century. In 1895, twelve businessmen from Omaha, including Herman Kountze, started the Knights of Ak-Sar-Ben. Their mission, "to build a more prosperous Heartland, where communities can flourish and every child can succeed," carries on to this day. Featuring a lagoon filled with Venetian gondolas, it attracted 2.6 million visitors at a time when Omaha's population was roughly 100,000.

1900 to 1949
In 1913, First National Bank became one of the first banks to specifically target women with a Ladies' Department. Staffed with female tellers in a comfortable and accommodating setting, it helped make banking a mainstream activity for women. During a five-year span ending in 1933, the Great Depression caused more than 750 Nebraska banks to close. On one Saturday in August, skittish depositors begin withdrawing their funds en masse from Omaha banks. When their requests were met, the banks proved their solvency; if not, the banks faced almost certain collapse. During this period First National Bank extended their hours and honored every withdrawal.

1950 to 1999
In 1953, under the leadership of John Lauritzen, First National Bank became the first bank in the region and the fifth in the nation to issue its own credit card. Also in 1953, First National Merchant Solutions began processing for 125 merchants. In 1971, employees started moving into the 22-story First National Center. Attached to a 420-room hotel and a 550-stall parking garage, it became one of the most modern buildings in the region, providing economic development in downtown Omaha.

2000 to present

In 2000, First National Bank designated two parcels of green space for the city of Omaha. They are the current sites of two sculpture parks called "Spirit of Nebraska's Wilderness" and "Pioneer Courage". Working in tandem, the two sculptures join to make one of the largest bronze sculptures in the world. In 2002, First National Bank completed construction on the First National Tower, the tallest building between Chicago and Denver.

It was announced on February 8, 2008, that Mills County Bank in Glenwood, Iowa and Silver City, Iowa will transition to First National Bank of Omaha, effective February 9, 2008. The full transition to First National Bank was completed on June 20, 2008. In March 2008, First National Bank opened a new branch with their new partnership with Scooter's Coffeehouse, started in Bellevue, Nebraska and have their operations based out of Omaha. This new branch is located in the Old Market in Downtown Omaha.

Beginning September 30, 2010, it was announced that First National of Nebraska consolidated its bank charters of First National Bank of Colorado, in Fort Collins, Colorado; First National Bank of Kansas, in Overland Park, Kansas; and Castle Bank, in DeKalb, Illinois, with its First National Bank of Omaha charter.

In August 2016, First National Bank of Omaha was disciplined for numerous deceptive marketing and unfair billing practices, affecting hundreds of thousands of consumers between 1997 and 2013. In dual civil enforcement actions, the Consumer Financial Protection Bureau (CFPB) and the Office of the Comptroller of the Currency (OCC) penalized the bank with fines of $4.5 million and $3 million, respectively. The bank entered into consent decrees accepting the civil penalties without admitting fault, committing to end the illegal practices, and pledging to make restitution to the people harmed by the bank's actions. The CFPB identified $27.75 million in restitution owed by First National Bank of Omaha to about 257,000 consumers, determining that the bank "[d]isguised the fact that it was selling" debt cancellation products to customers waiting for card activations over the phone, "[d]istracted consumers into making a purchase" of those products, marketed those products to people who were ineligible for some of the benefits, "[h]indered consumers from obtaining debt cancellation product benefits", and "[m]ade cancellation of debt cancellation products difficult". Additionally, some cardholders were "[b]illed for credit monitoring services not provided". In the OCC action, additional restitution was ordered for "customers who enrolled in and paid for identity theft protection products between December 1997 and July 2013, but did not receive the full benefit of the products". First National Bank of Omaha apologized to its customers, and alleged that one of its contractors, Affinion, and its subsidiary Trilegiant, were responsible for some of the problems.

On February 22, 2018 the bank announced it would no longer renew its contract with the National Rifle Association as a result of customer feedback after a recent school shooting controversy in Florida. The bank had offered special branded Visa cards to NRA members to support the group.

Historical leadership

Presidents
After three years as the President of FNBO, Rajive Johri retired on January 6, 2009. Dan O'Neill, who is also the president of First National of Nebraska, has succeeded Johri as president. During his three years, chairman Bruce Lauritzen states that Johri engineered the significant growth of the credit card division, introduced the banks online savings product and opened up the first branches in Iowa.

Branches
Currently, First National Bank has branches in Nebraska, Iowa, Texas, Colorado, Kansas and Illinois. On September 6, 1984, FNBO acquired David City Bank in David City. On May 31, 1988, FNBO acquired First Security Bank & Trust Co. in Beatrice. On November 21, 1989, FNBO acquired First of Omaha Savings Co. in Omaha.

Texas is also the home to four branches, although they operate under the name of First National Bank Southwest. On December 15, 2000, FNBO acquired First State Bank in Frisco. The initial branches in Glenwood opened on January 1, 1883, as Mills County State Bank. On May 1, 2001, they changed their name to Mills County Bank, N.A. On February 9, 2008, they merged with First National Bank of Omaha. The first branch in Council Bluffs opened on July 28, 2008. The first First National Bank Iowa branch opened in Des Moines on June 30, 2008.

In the June 19, 2008, edition of the Omaha World-Herald, Rajive Johri, president of First National Bank, stated that First National had planned to open a branch office in Des Moines, Iowa during the summer, but due to the recent flooding in the area, the opening date was pushed back to the fall.

First National Bank Colorado
Branches in Colorado: Fort Collins, Boulder, Brighton, Broomfield, Denver, Evans, Fort Lupton, Greeley, Johnstown, Kersey, Longmont, Louisville, Loveland, Platteville, Wellington, Westminster, and Windsor

Since 1881, First National Bank has been in business in Colorado. First National Bank of Fort Collins was formed on May 15, 1934 with the original name of First National Bank. Its name was changed to First Interstate Bank of Fort Collins, National Association on June 1, 1981. On June 13, 1994, the name was changed back to First National Bank. Union Colony Bank in Greeley, Colorado was acquired by First National Bank February 15, 2008.

On February 15, 2008, First National Bank of Colorado, First National Bank of Fort Collins and Union Colony Bank merged under First National Bank Colorado.

First National Bank Kansas
Branches in Kansas: Fairway, Olathe, Overland Park, and Shawnee
First National Bank of Kansas (FNBK) was chartered in 1993 when FNNI purchased approximately $80 million deposits from a failed financial institution. The bank purchased additional deposits approximating $220 million from another financial institution in 1994. To profitably invest this large deposit base, FNBK purchased credit card receivables from an affiliated bank. Most of the receivables originated outside the bank's assessment area. While credit card receivables still represent a large percentage of bank assets, credit card lending is not a strategic goal for the bank.

First National Bank Illinois 
Branches in Illinois:  Lake in the Hills, Huntley, Marengo, Harvard, Belvidere, Dekalb, Sycamore, Sugar Grove, Oswego, Sandwich, and Yorkville.

FNBO Direct
FNBO Direct, a division of First National Bank of Omaha, started operations in November 2006 at a 5.25% annual percentage yield (APY). FNBO Direct launched a nationwide campaign to promote their online savings account on May 1, 2007. In honor of the bank's 150th anniversary, the APY was placed at 6.0% for 150 days from May 1 through September 28, 2007. In an e-mail sent to customers at the end of August, it was announced that the FNBO Direct Credit Card will give a competitive interest rate and cash back rewards that would be deposited directly into the online savings account. The credit card product launched to a selected number of customers that currently have an online savings account on September 26, 2007. On November 28, 2007, FNBO Direct launched an Online Billpay account as well as offering a certificate of deposit available, at first, for four different terms (9 month, 12 month, 18 month, and 24 month). Currently, customers are able to choose from a six-month term as well.

First National Merchant Solutions
In addition to being a top-10 payment processor, First National Merchant Solutions is also the 4th largest bank processor in the United States and is the 6th largest in-house processor of credit cards. In 1967, First National Bank of Omaha automated many of its manual credit card processes and was the first credit card processing center in the nation to offer descriptive billing statements. In 1988, First National Bank of Omaha became the first processor to develop authorization slips for restaurants with a blank area for including tip. A couple of years later, FNBO's acquiring division was renamed to First of Omaha Merchant Processing. First of Omaha Merchant Processing received the 1994 Member Service Quality Performance Award for Best Copy Performance by an acquirer with Visa sales over $1.5 billion. In 2002, First of Omaha Merchant Processing changed its name to First National Merchant Solutions. A year later, FNMS celebrated its 50th year of processing payments. First National Merchant Solutions became one of the first processors to offer merchants ACH and credit card transactions in the same batch file in 2004. The following year, First National Merchant Solutions introduced First Resolution OnlineTM, the first chargeback management tool in the market to allow merchants to resolve chargebacks online.

FNBO also underwrites for two large ISO's, International Merchant Services, located in Westmont, Illinois, and Merchant Services, Inc. of Farmingdale, New Jersey. On April 1, 2010, TSYS announced that they would be acquiring 51% of the merchant division, and the remaining 49% would remain under the ownership of FNBO. The new name of the company is First National Merchant Solutions, LLC (FNMS).

It was announced on January 4, 2011, that TSYS would acquire the remaining 49% of the company, thus changing their name to TSYS Merchant Solutions.

First Bankcard
In 1953, First National's consumer finance operation launched its "First Charge" card which remains to this day the most profitable innovation in First National's long history. The bank issued a simple little card, which was nothing more than a white piece of plasticized paper, complete with a green logo, and an inscription which spelled "First Charge Account Service" and a red number which served to identify the cardholder. First Bankcard is one of the top three banks serving the credit card needs of other financial institutions, including Union Bank of California and People's Bank. First Bankcard also services credit cards for Major League Lacrosse, World of Warcraft, Scheels All Sports, just to name a few. SunTrust Bank announced on December 12, 2006, that it signed an agreement with Atlanta-based InfiCorp Holdings, Inc. (subsidiary of First National of Nebraska) for issuing consumer credit cards. Under terms of the agreement, InfiCorp will market, originate and service SunTrust-branded cards starting in the first quarter of 2007, focusing on SunTrust clients.

Interest rate lawsuit

An Iowa resident by the name of Fred Fisher received an unsolicited BankAmericard from First National Bank Omaha, in February 1969. Fisher filed a complaint against the Omaha bank on September 3, 1971, for exporting Nebraska's higher interest rates to his state. He told the U.S. District Court that since the Iowa legislature had fixed the usury ceiling at nine percent, First National was breaking the law by charging him 18 percent for advance of up to $500. Marquette threatened by taking the Omaha bank to the U.S. Supreme Court if necessary if their practice continued. The Marquette bank offered credit cards for a $10 fee at a flat rate of 12 percent interest on outstanding credit. First National required no fee and it charged 18 percent interest for credit up to $500 and 12 percent on all additional balances.

Marquette began to lobby for the passage of a state law designed to put a 12 percent ceiling on all bank credit card outstandings. In May 1976, about one month after that measure was signed into law, Marquette filed a suit to make its Omaha rival conform to the 12 percent limit. The decision maintained that the 115-year-old National Bank Act takes precedence over usury statues in individual states. Justice William J. Brennan Jr. wrote that the 1863 law permitted a national bank to charge interest at the rate allowed by the regulations of the state in which the lending institution is located. On July 25, 1979, the Iowa Supreme Court overturned their decision that was made on August 30, 1978.

Closing of the Kearney Call Center
It was announced on the Kearney Hub's website that the Kearney call center would be closing effective February 28, 2009. FNBO planned to move its customer service operations in Kearney to its locations in Bloomfield, Omaha and Wayne, Nebraska, after formal approval by its board of directors. "First National Credit Card Center has been growing profitably over the past three years. This consolidation plan is designed to fully utilize our call center facilities to support future growth, while allowing us to be more efficient." President Stephen Eulie said in a press release. "It will result in a significant increase in the number of employees at our other sites and improved career options for those individuals." He said the decision to close the Kearney call center and move those positions will enable the company to more effectively centralize operations functions while reducing the expense of managing its overall business. Operations at the call centers include inbound customer service, credit card collections, account activity alert and fraud prevention, credit analysis, credit account processing, specialized customer contact and technology support. First National has operated the call center in Kearney since 1992.

Buildings

The Northern Natural Gas Building is located at 2223 Dodge Street in Omaha, Nebraska, United States. It is a 260ft (79 m), 19-story skyscraper. This building housed the credit card operations until the opening of the First National Tower in 2002.

First National Business Park is located at just north of Boys Town in West Omaha. First National Business Park is located at 144th & Dodge Streets. First National Bank occupies 14010 FNB Parkway. There is also a bank branch located at the business park at 14310 FNB Parkway. Valmont Industries has their corporate headquarters located at One Valmont Plaza, which is also located in the Business Park. It was announced on October 23, 2008, that Yahoo will be coming to the Omaha Metro Area. Yahoo stated that the First National Business Park will be the home to the customer care center that should open next April.

First National Center is a 22-story office building in downtown Omaha. The building is attached to a 420-room hotel and a 550-stall parking garage. The First National Center is located at 1620 Dodge St in downtown Omaha. The hotel that is joining the First National Center is the Doubletree Hotel.

With the completion of the First National Technology Center, FNBO became the first business in the country to utilize hydrogen fuel cells. In 2008, ComputerWorld named First National of Nebraska as the third best in a top 12 list of "Green-IT Companies" In 2012, First National Bank of Omaha upgraded its fuel cell system to a PureCell Model 400. The fuel cell is installed in the main floor of the building and provides 400kW of heat and power to the facility.

The First National Bank Tower is a 634 ft (193 m), 45-story skyscraper at 1601 Dodge Street in downtown Omaha. Built in 2002, it is currently the tallest building in Nebraska, as well as the tallest building between Minneapolis and Denver. It was built on the site of the former "Medical Arts Building" which was imploded on April 2, 1999. Inside the glass lobby is a large section of the ornamental facade from the former "Medical Arts Building".

See also
 Economy of Omaha, Nebraska

References

Credit cards in the United States
Banks based in Omaha, Nebraska
Privately held companies based in Nebraska
Privately held companies of the United States
Economy of the Midwestern United States
Economy of the Southwestern United States
Kountze family
Banks established in 1857
Merchant services
1857 establishments in Nebraska Territory